George Meadows was an African American man who was lynched on January 15, 1889, in Jefferson County, Alabama, United States.

Lynching and aftermath 
On January 14, 1889, a white woman reported that she had been raped and her son killed by an African American man. Over 400 white coal miners formed themselves into groups and brought several black men to the woman, who was unable to identify any of them as the alleged criminal. The next day, the miners brought Meadows, a new arrival to the area, and after a brief investigation, determined him to be guilty. The woman begged the mob not to lynch Meadows, as she was unsure if he was the criminal, but the mob went forward with the lynching and killed him near the Pratt mines. Following his death, his body was shot multiple times and left in public view by an undertaker. Meadows was later buried in a paupers' grave in what is now Lane Park in Birmingham, Alabama.

On January 16, the sheriff decided that Meadows was not the actual perpetrator of the crime, and subsequently, another African American man, Lewis Jackson, was arrested.

In 2019, Tony Bingham, a professor at Miles College and an advisor for the Jefferson County Memorial Project, announced his intent to either locate the site of Meadows's grave or have the Birmingham Zoo or Birmingham Botanical Gardens (both of which are located in Lane Park) erect a memorial at their facilities.

References

External links 
 

- List of lynching victims in the United States

1889 deaths
1889 in Alabama
1889 murders in the United States
American murder victims
Deaths by person in Alabama
January 1889 events
Jefferson County, Alabama
Lynching deaths in Alabama
Murdered African-American people
People murdered in Alabama
Racially motivated violence against African Americans